The Root is an African American-oriented online magazine. It was launched on January 28, 2008, by Henry Louis Gates Jr. and Donald E. Graham.

History 
The Root was owned by Graham Holdings Company through its online subsidiary, The Slate Group. In 2015, Graham Holdings sold The Root to Univision Communications. The site was subsequently re-launched under the Kinja platform used by other Gizmodo Media Group (formerly Gawker Media) websites. GMG was later succeeded by G/O Media as owner of The Root.

In July 2017, the blog Very Smart Brothas, co-founded by Damon Young and Panama Jackson, became a vertical of The Root.

Danielle Belton was editor-in-chief at The Root between 2017 and 2021, when she was appointed editor of HuffPost. On April 14, 2021, it was announced that Vanessa De Luca had been appointed editor-in-chief.

Since April 2021 The Root has seen substantial staff turnover with 15 out of the 16 full-time staffers resigning following internal tensions, with former staff member Michael Harriot saying that, "as a staff, we came to the conclusion that, basically, The Root is over."

The Root 100
The Root 100 is the magazine's annual "list of the 100 most important black influencers between the ages of 25 and 45." This list has been published since 2011. Readers of The Root are allowed to nominate those who they feel are deserving of being on this list. The list has had a wide variety of people from celebrities such as Donald Glover, writers like Roxane Gay, and athletes. Other influential people in the black community who are not as well known, such as activists, are encouraged to be added to the list as well.

References

External links
 
 C-SPAN Q&A interview with The Root Managing Editor Lynette Clemetson, October 12, 2008

African-American magazines
Online magazines published in the United States
American political websites
Magazines established in 2008
Fusion Media Group
Former Univision Communications subsidiaries